The Chitake River flows through the Mana Pools National Park, Zimbabwe, and has its source in the  Zambezi Escarpment. The source is a perennial spring at the foothills, which flows for 1 kilometre within the canyon walls. The river discharges into the Rukomechi River.

There is a major fossil site on the Chitake River, where large numbers of Syntarsus rhodesiensis have been found.

Source: 
Mouth: 

Rivers of Zimbabwe